The Emisor Oriente Tunnel, also known as the Tunel Emisor Oriente, Eastern Discharge Tunnel, Eastern Wastewater Tunnel, and East Issuing Tunnel, is a wastewater treatment tunnel in Mexico City, Mexico. At , it is the eighth longest tunnel in the world.
It was constructed between 2008 and 2019 using a tunnel boring machine. Serving a population of 20 million, it runs from Mexico City to the Atotonilco Wastewater Treatment Plant in Hidalgo state. It runs at a maximum depth of 200 meters (656 Feet) below ground level and has a discharge capacity of 150 m3/s. This tunnel will help prevent flooding and serves as an alternate exit for the Emisor Central, another drainage tunnel.

In order to prevent collapse, the tunnel is constructed using a lining with segmental rings made of concrete and steel.

The estimated cost for the tunnel was 15 billion pesos. After completion, the tunnel was realized to have gone over budget and cost 30 billion pesos.

References

External links
Image of boring machine
Map

Buildings and structures in Mexico City
Tunnels in Mexico